Richard J. Allen (born November 13, 1959 in  New York, New York, USA) is an American television soap opera writer. He is professor and former chair of the department of Film, Television and Digital Media at Texas Christian University in Fort Worth.  Allen is also a playwright whose produced plays include "The Man Who Killed Rock Monnenoff," "Seducing Sally" and "Starbright & Vine."  Allen is Jewish. He also published "Parashah Plays"—a collection of children's plays covering every portion of the torah.

Positions held
Another World
 Script Writer: 1997 - 1999

As the World Turns
 Script Writer: 1999 - 2001

Days of Our Lives
 Co-Head Writer: 1990 - 1991, 1992
 Breakdown Writer: 1986 - 1989
 Occasional Script Writer: March 2003 - June 2003

General Hospital
 Script Writer: 1992 - 1993

One Life to Live (hired by Michael Malone)
 Script Writer: 1993 - 1995

Awards and nominations
Daytime Emmy Award
Win, 2002, Best Writing, As the World Turns
Win, 2001, Best Writing, As the World Turns
Nomination, 1987, Best Writing, Days of our Lives

Writers Guild of America Award
Nomination, 1997, Best Writing, Another World
Nomination, 1991, Best Writing, Days of our Lives
Nomination, 1987, Best Writing, Days of our Lives

References

External links

American soap opera writers
American male television writers
Jewish American screenwriters
1959 births
Living people
21st-century American Jews